Neotremella is a genus of fungi in the family Tremellaceae. The genus is monotypic, containing the single species Neotremella guzmanii, found in Mexico.

References

External links
 

Tremellomycetes
Fungi of North America
Monotypic Basidiomycota genera